Scholastic Lutheran Christology is the orthodox Lutheran theology of Jesus, developed using the methodology of Lutheran scholasticism.

On the general basis of the Chalcedonian christology and following the 
indications of the Scriptures as the only rule of faith, the Protestant (especially the Lutheran) scholastics at the close of the sixteenth and during the seventeenth century built some additional features and developed new aspects of Christ's person. The propelling cause was the Lutheran doctrine of the real presence or omnipresence of Christ's body in the Lord's Supper, and the controversies growing out of it with the Zwinglians and Calvinists, and among the Lutherans themselves. These new features relate to the communion of the two natures, and to the states and the offices of Christ. The first was the production of the Lutheran Church, and was never adopted, but partly rejected, by the Reformed; the second and third were the joint doctrines of both, but with a very material difference in the understanding of the second.

Communicatio idiomatum 

The   means the communication of attributes or properties (Gk. idiomata, Lat.  ) of one nature to the other, or to the whole person. Lutheran theologians distinguish three kinds or genera:

  (or ), whereby the properties of one nature are transferred and applied to the whole person, for which are quoted such passages as Rom. i. 3 ; I Pet. iii. 18, iv. 1.

  The  , whereby the redemptory functions and actions which belong to the whole person (the ) are predicated only of one or the other nature (I Tim. ii. 5–6 ; Heb. i. 2 3).

 Under this head the Lutheran Church claims a certain ubiquity or omnipresence for the body of Christ, on the ground of the personal union of the two natures; but as to the extent of this omnipresence there were two distinct schools which are both represented in Formula of Concord (1577). Brenz and the Swabian Lutherans maintained an absolute ubiquity of Christ's humanity from his very infancy, thus making the incarnation not only an assumption of the human nature, but also a deification of it, although the divine attributes were admitted to have been concealed during the state of humiliation. Martin Chemnitz and the Saxon divines called this view a monstrosity, and taught only a relative ubiquity, depending on Christ's will (hence called , or ), who may be present with his whole person wherever he pleases to be or has promised to be.

But this is decidedly rejected by the old Lutherans as inconsistent with the unchangeableness of the divine nature, and as a "horrible and blasphemous" doctrine (Formula of Concord, p. 612), but is asserted by the modern Kenoticists.

The third genus can never be fully carried out, unless the humanity of Christ is also eternalized. The attributes, moreover, are not an outside appendix, but inherent qualities of the substance to which they belong, and inseparable from it. Hence a communication of attributes would imply a communication or mixture of natures. The divine and human natures can indeed hold free and intimate intercourse with each other; but the divine nature can never be transformed into the human, nor the human nature into the divine. Christ possessed all the attributes of both natures; but the natures, nevertheless, remain separate and distinct.

The twofold state of Christ 

This is the state of humiliation and the state of exaltation. This doctrine is based upon . The state of humiliation embraces the supernatural conception, birth, circumcision, education, earthly life, passion, death, and burial of Christ; the state of exaltation includes the resurrection, ascension, and the sitting at the right hand of God.

But here, again, the two confessions differ very considerably. First as to the descent into Hades. The Scholastic Lutherans (see: Lutheran High orthodoxy, 1600–1685) regarded it as a triumph over Hell, and made it the first stage of exaltation; while the Reformed divines viewed it as the last stage of the state of humiliation. It may be viewed as the turning-point from the one state to the other, and thus belonging to both. Secondly, the Lutheran Confessions of the Book of Concord refer the two states only to the human nature of Christ, regarding the divine as not susceptible of any humiliation or exaltation.

The Reformed divines refer them to both natures; so that Christ's human nature was in a state of humiliation as compared with its future exaltation, and his divine nature was in the state of humiliation as to its external manifestation. With them, the incarnation itself is the beginning of the state of humiliation, while the Book of Concord excludes the incarnation from the humiliation.

Finally, the Scholastic Lutherans regard the humiliation only as a partial concealment of the actual use (Gk. ) of the divine attributes by the incarnate Logos.

The threefold office of Christ 

The threefold office or function of Christ was first presented by Eusebius of Caesarea. The theologians who followed Luther and Melanchthon down to the middle of the seventeenth century treat Christ's saving work under the two heads of king and priest. Calvin, in the first edition of his Institutes of the Christian Religion (1536), did the same, and it was not till the third edition (1559) and the Genevan Catechism that he fully presented the three offices. This convenient threefold division of the office of Christ was used by the theologians of both confessions during the seventeenth century. Ernesti opposed it, but Schleiermacher restored it.

 The prophetical office (or ) includes teaching and the miracles of Christ.

 The priestly office consists of the satisfaction made for the sins of the world by the death on the cross, and in the continued intercession of the exalted Savior for his people.

 The kingly office, whereby Christ founded his kingdom, defends his Church against all enemies, and rules all things in heaven and on earth. The old divines distinguish between the reign of nature, which embraces all things; the reign of grace, which relates to the Church militant on earth; and the reign of glory, which belongs to the Church triumphant in heaven.

See also
Extra calvinisticum

References

Lutheran theology
Christology